Ani Rural District is in the Central District of Germi County, Ardabil province, Iran. At the census of 2006, its population was 6,251 in 1,220 households; there were 5,421 inhabitants in 1,351 households at the following census of 2011; and in the most recent census of 2016, the population of the rural district was 4,364 in 1,289 households. The largest of its 22 villages was Ani-ye Olya, with 813 people.

References 

Germi County

Rural Districts of Ardabil Province

Populated places in Ardabil Province

Populated places in Germi County